Shiravand (also Romanized as Shīrāvand and Shīr Āvand; also known as Deh Now) is a village in Solgi Rural District, Khezel District, Nahavand County, Hamadan Province, Iran. At the 2006 census, its population was 996, in 252 families.

References 

Populated places in Nahavand County